The Hurro-Urartian languages are an extinct language family of the Ancient Near East, comprising only two known languages: Hurrian and Urartian.

Origins
It is often assumed that the Hurro-Urartian languages (or a pre-split Proto-Hurro-Urartian language) were originally spoken in the Kura-Araxes culture.

External classification
While the genetic relation between Hurrian and Urartian is undisputed, the wider connections of Hurro-Urartian to other language families are controversial. After the decipherment of Hurrian and Urartian inscriptions and documents in the 19th and early 20th century, Hurrian and Urartian were soon recognized as not related to the Semitic nor to the Indo-European languages, and to date, the most conservative view holds that Hurro-Urartian is a primary language family not demonstrably related to any other language family.

Early proposals for an external genetic relationship of Hurro-Urartian variously grouped them with the Kartvelian languages, Elamite, and other non-Semitic and non-Indo-European languages of the region.

Igor Diakonoff and Sergei Starostin suggested that Hurro-Urartian can be included as a branch of the Northeastern Caucasian language family, the latter dubbed Alarodian languages by Diakonoff. Several studies argue that the connection is probable. Other scholars, however, doubt that the language families are related, or believe that, while a connection is possible, the evidence is far from conclusive. Uralicist and Indo-Europeanist Petri Kallio argues that the matter is hindered by the lack of consensus about how to reconstruct Proto-Northeast-Caucasian, but that Alarodian is the most promising proposal for relations with Northeast Caucasian, greater than rival proposals to link it with Northwest Caucasian or other families. However, nothing is known about Alarodians except that they "were armed like the Colchians and Saspeires," according to Herodotus. Colchians and Saspeires are generally associated with Kartvelians or Scythians. Additionally, leading Urartologist Paul Zimansky rejected a connection between Urartians and Alarodians.

Arnaud Fournet and Allan R. Bomhard argue that Hurro-Urartian is a sister family to Indo-European.

The poorly attested Kassite language may have belonged to the Hurro-Urartian language family.

Contacts with other languages
Hurrian was the language of the Hurrians (occasionally called "Hurrites"), and was spoken in the northern parts of Mesopotamia and Syria and the southeastern parts of Anatolia between at least last quarter of the third millennium BC and its extinction towards the end of the second millennium BC. There have been various Hurrian-speaking states, of which the most prominent one was the kingdom of Mitanni (1450–1270 BC). It has also been proposed that two little known groups, the Nairi and the Mannae, might have been Hurrian speakers, but as little is known about them, it is hard to draw any conclusions about what languages they spoke. Furthermore, the Kassite language was possibly related to Hurro-Urartian. Francfort and Tremblay on the basis of the Akkadian textual and archaeological evidence, proposed to identify the kingdom of Marhashi and Ancient Margiana. The Marhashite personal names seems to point towards an Eastern variant of Hurrian or another language of the Hurro-Urartian language family.

There was also a strong Hurrian influence on Hittite culture in ancient times, so many Hurrian texts are preserved from Hittite political centres. The Mitanni variety is chiefly known from the so-called "Mitanni letter" from Hurrian Tushratta to pharaoh Amenhotep III surviving in the Amarna archives. The "Old Hurrian" variety is known from some early royal inscriptions and from religious and literary texts, especially from Hittite centres.

Urartian is attested from the late 9th century BC to the late 7th century BC as the official written language of the state of Urartu and was probably spoken by the majority of the population in the mountainous areas around Lake Van and the upper Zab valley. It branched off from Hurrian at approximately the beginning of the second millennium BC. Scholars, such as Paul Zimansky, contend that Urartian was only spoken by a small ruling class and was not the primary language of the majority of the population.

Although Hurro-Urartian languages became extinct with the collapse of the Urartu empire, Diakonoff and Greppin suggested that traces of its vocabulary survived in a small number of loanwords in Old Armenian. More recent scholarship by Arnaud Fournet, Hrach Martirosyan, Armen Petrosyan, and others has proposed more extensive contacts between the languages, including vocabulary, grammar, parts of speech, and proper nouns loaned into from Armenian, such as Urartian "eue" ("and"), attested in the earliest Urartian texts (compare to Armenian "yev" (և, եվ), ultimately from Proto-Indo-European *h₁epi). Other loans from Armenian into Urartian includes personal names, toponyms, and names of deities.

There are some lexical matches between Hurro-Urartian and Sumerian, indicating an early contact.

Characteristics
Besides their fairly consistent ergative alignment and their generally agglutinative morphology (despite a number of not entirely predictable morpheme mergers), Hurrian and Urartian are also both characterized by the use of suffixes in their derivational and inflectional morphology (including ten to fifteen grammatical cases) and postpositions in syntax; both are considered to have the default order subject–object–verb, although there is significant variation, especially in Urartian. In both languages, nouns can receive a peculiar "anaphoric suffix" comparable (albeit apparently not identical) to a definite article, and nominal modifiers are marked by Suffixaufnahme (i.e. they receive a "copy" of the case suffixes of the head); in verbs, the type of valency (intransitive vs transitive) is signalled by a special suffix, the so-called "class marker". The complex morpheme "chains" of nouns and verbs follow roughly the same morpheme sequences in both languages. In nouns, the sequence in both languages is stem – article – possessive suffix – plural suffix – case suffix – agreement (Suffixaufnahme) suffix. In verbs, the portion of the structure shared by both languages is stem – valency marker – person suffixes. Most morphemes have fairly similar phonological forms in the two languages.

Despite this structural similarity, there are also significant differences. In the phonology, written Hurrian only seems to distinguish a single series of phonemic obstruents without any contrastive phonation distinctions (the variation in voicing, though visible in the script, was allophonic); in contrast, written Urartian distinguishes as many as three series: voiced, voiceless and "emphatic" (perhaps glottalized). Urartian is also characterized by the apparent reduction of some word-final vowels to schwa (e.g. Urartian ulə vs Hurrian oli "another", Urartian eurišə vs Hurrian evrišše "lordship", Hurrian 3rd person plural enclitic pronoun -lla vs Urartian -lə). As the last two examples shows, the Hurrian geminates are also absent in Urartian.

In the morphology, there are differences as well. Hurrian indicates the plural of nouns through a special suffix -až-, which only survives in fossilized form merged into some case endings in Urartian. Hurrian clearly marks tense or aspect through special suffixes (the unmarked form is the present tense) whereas Urartian has not been shown to do so in the attested texts (the unmarked form functions as a past tense). Hurrian has special negative verbal suffixes that negate a verb and are placed before the ergative person agreement suffixes; Urartian has no such thing and instead uses negative particles that are placed before the verb. In Hurrian, only the person of the ergative subject is marked obligatorily through a suffix in a verb form, whereas the absolutive subject or object is optionally marked with a pronominal enclitic that need not be attached to the verb and can also be attached to any other word in the clause. In Urartian, the ergative suffixes and the absolutive clitics have merged into a single set of obligatory suffixes that express the person of both the ergative and the absolutive participant and are an integral part of the verb. In general, the profusion of freely moving pronominal and conjunctional clitics that characterize Hurrian, especially that of the Mitanni letter, has few parallels in Urartian.

Urartian is closer to the so-called Old Hurrian variety (mostly attested in Hittite documents) than to the Hurrian of the Mitanni letter. For example, both use -o-/-u- (rather than -i-) as the marker of transitive valency and both display the plural suffix -it-, expressing the number of the ergative subject and occupying a position before the valency marker.

Cognates
Below are some Hurrian and Urartian lexical cognates, as listed by Kassian (2010).

{| class="wikitable sortable"
! gloss !! Hurrian !! Urartian
|-
| all || šua=lla || šui=ni-
|-
| to burn (tr.) || am- || am-
|-
| come || un- || nun=a-
|-
| to give || ar- || ar-
|-
| hand || šu=ni || šu-
|-
| to hear || haš- || haš-
|-
| heart || tiša || tiš=ni
|-
| I || iš-/šu- || iš-/šu-
|-
| mountain || pab=ni || baba=ni
|-
| name || tiye || ti=ni
|-
| new || šuhe || šuhi
|-
| not || =u || u=i, =u=ri
|-
| one || šu=kki || šu=sini
|-
| road || hari || hari
|-
| to go || ušš- || uš-
|-
| year || šawali || šali 
|}

References

Further reading
 Fournet, Arnaud. 2013. "Eléments De Morphologie Et De Syntaxe De La Langue Hourrite. Destinés à l’étude Des Textes Mittaniens Et Anatolo-Hittites". In: Bulletin De l’Académie Belge Pour l’Étude Des Langues Anciennes Et Orientales 2 (avril), pp. 3–52. https://doi.org/10.14428/babelao.vol2.2013.19843.
 Khachikyan, Margarit (2019). "Towards the Reconstruction of the Hurro-Urartian Protolanguage." In: Over the Mountains and Far Away: Studies in Near Eastern History and Archaeology Presented to Mirjo Salvini on the Occasion of His 80th Birthday, edited by Avetisyan Pavel S., Dan Roberto, and Grekyan Yervand H. Summertown: Archaeopress. 304-06..

External links

Comparative Notes on Hurro-Urartian, Northern Caucasian and Indo-European 

 
Pre-Indo-Europeans
Language families
Cuneiform